Edward Bennett Lively (born March 5, 1992) is an American professional baseball pitcher in the Cincinnati Reds organization. He previously played in Major League Baseball (MLB) for the Philadelphia Phillies and the Kansas City Royals and in the KBO League for the Samsung Lions.

Early life and education
Lively was born to Edward and Ginny Lively in Pensacola, Florida. He began playing organized baseball at age 4 in the Tee-ball league; he was allowed to join a year early because of his prowess and the fact that his grandfather, Jim Lively, who coached him throughout his childhood, was the league commissioner. He is a graduate of Gulf Breeze High School.

The Cleveland Indians selected Lively in the 26th round of the 2010 Major League Baseball Draft out of high school. He did not sign and instead attended the University of Central Florida (UCF). In his three years pitching for the UCF Knights baseball team, he went 21–8 with a 3.06 earned run average (ERA) and 226 strikeouts over 244 innings. After his sophomore season in 2012, he played collegiate summer baseball for the Yarmouth–Dennis Red Sox of the Cape Cod Baseball League.

Career

Cincinnati Reds
The Cincinnati Reds selected Lively in the fourth round of the 2013 Major League Baseball Draft. He made his professional debut with the Billings Mustangs and made one start with the Dayton Dragons. Lively finished his first season, 0–4 but with a 0.88 ERA and 56 strikeouts in 41 innings. He started the 2014 season with the Bakersfield Blaze. He was named as the top player in the Reds' farm system in 2014 after posting a 13-7 record and 3.04 ERA with Bakersfield and the Double-A Pensacola Blue Wahoos.

Philadelphia Phillies
On December 31, 2014, the Reds traded Lively to the Philadelphia Phillies in exchange for Marlon Byrd.

In 2015, Lively went 8–7 with a 4.13 ERA in 25 games with the Double-A Reading Fightin Phils. He began the 2016 season with Reading before being promoted to the Triple-A Lehigh Valley IronPigs. He received the 2016 Paul Owens Award as best pitcher in the Phillies' farm system. The Phillies added him to their 40-man roster after the 2016 season. He was assigned to Lehigh Valley to begin the 2017 season.

On June 3, 2017, Lively made his major league debut with the Philadelphia Phillies against the San Francisco Giants. He allowed one run on four hits and three walks, earning his first major league win. In his June 24 start against the Arizona Diamondbacks, he collected his first major league RBI with a 2-run home run, but gave up 4 earned runs and took the 9–2 loss. He finished his rookie season with a 4-7 record and 4.26 ERA in 15 major league appearances. In 2018, Lively pitched in 5 games for Philadelphia, but after struggling to an 0-2 record and 6.85 ERA, he was designated for assignment on September 3, 2018.

Kansas City Royals
On September 5, 2018, Lively was claimed off waivers by the Kansas City Royals, who then designated Eric Stout for assignment to add Lively to the 40-man roster. Lively recorded a 1.35 ERA in 6.2 innings of work for Kansas City in 2018. He was assigned to the Triple-A Omaha Storm Chasers to begin the 2019 season. Lively himself was designated for assignment on June 20, 2019 following the promotion of Humberto Arteaga. He allowed 3 runs in the only inning he pitched for Kansas City.

Arizona Diamondbacks
On June 22, 2019, Lively was traded to the Arizona Diamondbacks in exchange for cash considerations. He was assigned to the Triple-A Reno Aces, where he recorded a 5.04 ERA and 2-1 record across 7 appearances.

Samsung Lions
On August 7, 2019, Lively left the Diamondbacks organization to sign with the Samsung Lions of the KBO League. Lively pitched to a 4-4 record and a 3.95 ERA in his first season with Samsung. Lively re-signed with Samsung for the 2020 season on a $700,000 contract. In 2020 he pitched to a 6-7 record and 4.26 ERA in 21 appearances. Lively only made six appearances in 2021, registering a 4.05 ERA. On June 1, 2021, Lively was released after being diagnosed with a shoulder injury.

Cincinnati Reds
On January 6, 2022, Lively signed a minor league contract with the Cincinnati Reds. He resigned a minor league deal on November 19, 2022.

References

External links

UCF Knights bio

1992 births
Living people
American expatriate baseball players in South Korea
Baseball players from Pensacola, Florida
Major League Baseball pitchers
KBO League pitchers
Philadelphia Phillies players
Kansas City Royals players
Samsung Lions players
UCF Knights baseball players
Yarmouth–Dennis Red Sox players
Billings Mustangs players
Dayton Dragons players
Bakersfield Blaze players
Pensacola Blue Wahoos players
Florida Complex League Phillies players
Reading Fightin Phils players
Lehigh Valley IronPigs players
Omaha Storm Chasers players
Reno Aces players